Olympic Dreams could refer to two pieces of media produced related to the Olympic Games:

 Olympic Dreams (film), a 2019 American film directed by Jeremy Teicher
 Olympic Dreams (TV Series), a 2007–08 British television show on BBC